Saint-Ambroix is a commune in the Cher department in the Centre-Val de Loire region of France.

Geography
The commune borders the department of Indre.

Population

Sights
 The church, dating from the twelfth century.
 A fifteenth-century manorhouse.
 Considerable Roman remains: a graveyard and artefacts.
 The remains of the priory of Semur.

See also
Communes of the Cher department

References

Communes of Cher (department)
Bituriges Cubi